Aetos (Greek: , eagle) may refer to:

Places 
Aetos, Aetolia-Acarnania, a village in Medeon municipality, Aetolia-Acarnania, Greece
Aetos, Drama, a former village in Drama regional unit, Greece
Aetos, Euboea, a village in Karystos municipality, Euboea, Greece
Aetos, Florina, a municipality in the Florina regional unit, Greece
Aetos, Messenia, a municipality in Messenia, Greece
Aetos, Thesprotia, a village in Filiates municipality, Thesprotia, Greece
Aytos, a municipality in Burgas Province, Bulgaria

Other uses 
Aetos (motorcycle), a pre-World War I Italian bike
Aetos Security Management, a security company in Singapore
Aetos Skydra F.C., a football club 
Greek ship Aetos
Aëtos, figure from Greek mythology

See also

Antos (name)

Auburn Aetos: Division one college ultimate Frisbee team, has appeared in the last four college national championship tournament, highest finished tied for fifth in 2016.